Roberto Chery (16 February 1896 – 30 May 1919) was a Uruguayan football goalkeeper who played during the days of amateur sport in the Uruguayan Primera División (1900–1931).

Chery died while playing for Uruguay against Chile in the 1919 South American Championship. 

Brazil and Uruguay teams had scheduled a friendly match (Copa Rio Branco) for 19 June 1919. Due to the Uruguayan side declined to participate because of Chery's tragic death, Argentina offered to replace the Uruguayan side. After the Brazilian Federation accepted, the match (now named Copa Roberto Chery to honor the goalkeeper) was finally played. Argentina entered to the field wearing Uruguay's traditional light-blue jersey while Brazil wore the Peñarol jersey.

References

1896 births
1919 deaths
Association football players who died while playing
Uruguayan footballers
Uruguay international footballers

Association football goalkeepers
Sport deaths in Brazil